2-WIM was the designation given, by Southern Railway (SR), to a small fleet of electric multiple units, dedicated for use on the West Croydon to Wimbledon Line. None of these units survived long enough in British Rail ownership to be allocated a TOPS class.

Construction
The 2-WIM (2-car Wimbledon stock, numbers 1809–1812) units were rebuilt in 1929, from former Trailer First cars, originally used in ex-LBSCR AC electric SL stock. They were intended for use on the line between Wimbledon and Croydon. Originally these units had some First Class accommodation in the Driving Motor car, but this was later declassified to Third Class only. The units were numbered 1909–1912 before 1936, when those numbers were reused for new 2-BIL units.

Formations
Initial formations of these units were as follows:

Withdrawal
All four units were withdrawn in 1954, and subsequently scrapped.

References

SR 2Wim
Southern Railway (UK) electric multiple units
Train-related introductions in 1929
750 V DC multiple units